Masti Gudi is a 2017 Indian Kannada-language action film directed by Nagshekar, starring Duniya Vijay who is also credited for the film's story, Kriti Kharbanda and Amulya in lead roles.

On 7 November 2016, actors Anil Kumar and Raghava Uday drowned when they took a 60-feet plunge from a chopper while shooting film's climax. A rescue motorboat scheduled to pull the actors out of the water did not start, resulting in the immediate drowning of both the actors.

Summary
Maasthi questions powerful people killing tigers, and then takes the law into his own hands. Enter Rani. She learns of Bhavya, who was killed by her own family for eloping with Maasthi. Rani reveals her love for him. But he rejects her, saying that he still has Bhavya in his heart leaving Rani heartbroken. He kills the villains. The film shifts to present where Rani is now old and has written Maasthi's story in a book.

Cast
 Duniya Vijay as Maasthi
 Kriti Kharbanda as Rani
 Amulya as Bhavya
 B. Jayashree
 Srinivasa Murthy
 H. G. Dattatreya
 Shobhraj
 Devaraj as Forest Officer
 Sadhu Kokila
 Raghava Uday 
 Anil Kumar 
 Suhasini Maniratnam
 Rangayana Raghu as Ajju
  M K Mata
 Ravishankar Gowda
  Tiger sushma Raj

Production

Filming 
Actors Anil Kumar and Raghava Uday drowned while performing an action scene at Thippagondanahalli Reservoir, 35 kilometers west of Bangalore on 7 November. The action scene was shot under the supervision of stunt director Ravi Varma and the scene required Duniya Vijay with Anil Kumar and Raghava Uday jumping off into the lake from the helicopter. Duniya Vijay managed to swim ashore but Anil and Uday were not able to make it to the shore.

Soundtrack

Sadhu Kokila composed the soundtrack for the film. The soundtrack album consists of five songs. Lyrics for the tracks were written by Kaviraj.

Reception 
The Times of India rated the film 2.5 out of 5, saying, "While this film does seem a tad underwhelming eventually, one can definitely go and watch the film for Vijay's acting and the underlying message about forest conservation".

See also
List of film accidents

References

2017 films
2010s Kannada-language films
Films set in forests
Indian action drama films
Fictional portrayals of the Karnataka Police
2017 action drama films
Films scored by Sadhu Kokila
Indian films about revenge
Indian supernatural thriller films
2010s masala films
2010s supernatural thriller films